Hotel Admiral ("Xотел Адмирал") is a 5 stars hotel in the center of the Golden Sands beach resort, Bulgaria.

The hotel was opened in 2004 and is located only 20 meters from the sea.

Interesting facts about the resort:
The Golden Sands resort is located in an ecologically clean bay on the northern Bulgarian Black sea coast near the Golden Sands Nature Park.
The beach is 3.5 km long and wide about 100 metres.
The resort received 12 times the Blue Flag from Foundation for Environmental Education, a certification that an operator of the beach, marina etc. complies with required standards.

See also 
List of hotels in Bulgaria

References

External links 
Homepage
Location on Google Maps.

Hotel buildings completed in 2004
Hotels established in 2004
Admiral